Jamie Stewart may refer to:

 Jamie Stewart (bassist) (born 1964), bassist of the 1980s British post-punk/hard rock group The Cult
 Jamie Stewart (cricketer) (born 1970), Australian cricketer
 Jamie Stewart (musician) (born 1978), leader of the American musical group Xiu Xiu
 Jamie B. Stewart, President and CEO of the Federal Farm Credit Banks Funding Corporation
 Jamie Stewart (EastEnders)

See also
Jamie Stuart (born 1976), English footballer
James Stewart (disambiguation)
James Stuart (disambiguation)